Vizcachas (Aymara and Quechua for viscacha,  Hispanicized spelling Vizcachas) is a  mountain in the Andes of southern Peru. It is situated in the Moquegua Region, Mariscal Nieto Province, Carumas District, and in the Tacna Region, Candarave Province, Candarave District. The mountain lies south-east of Vizcachas Lake.

See also 
 Panti Usu
 Paxsi Awki

References

Mountains of Peru
Mountains of Moquegua Region
Mountains of Tacna Region